Paraire Karaka Paikea (1 June 1894 – 6 April 1943) was a New Zealand Māori politician.

Early life
Of Te Uri-o-Hau and Ngāti Whātua descent, Paraire Karaka Paikea was born in Otamatea, in the Kaipara area of Northland.  An ordained Methodist Minister by 1921, he joined the Rātana movement and by 1924 was on the Rātana council. In June 1925 he was one of the original gazetted Rātana ministers.

Political career

Paikea captured the Rātana Movement's third Māori electorate of Northern Maori from Taurekareka Henare in 1938. He was Minister without portfolio representing the Māori race from 1941 to 1943 and was also Māori Recruiting Director on the War Administration Board. Known as "Piri Wiri Tua", after Tahupōtiki Wiremu Rātana, his early death on 6 April 1943 ended a promising career.

The need for a proposed by-election to be held on 19 June 1943 was avoided by a special Act of Parliament passed on 11 June 1943 (the By-elections Postponement Act 1943) postponing the vote until the (delayed) general election was held.

References

 Henderson, James Mcleod (1963). Ratana The Man, The Church, The Movement (1st ed.) A.H & A.W. Reed Ltd .

External links
Biography in the 1966 Encyclopaedia of New Zealand

1894 births
1943 deaths
New Zealand Labour Party MPs
Rātana MPs
Members of the Cabinet of New Zealand
New Zealand people of World War II
New Zealand Rātanas
New Zealand MPs for Māori electorates
Members of the New Zealand House of Representatives
Unsuccessful candidates in the 1935 New Zealand general election
Unsuccessful candidates in the 1928 New Zealand general election
Unsuccessful candidates in the 1931 New Zealand general election
Te Uri-o-Hau people
Ngāti Whātua people